Kishori Sah Kamal is a Nepalese politician who is elected member of Provincial Assembly of Madhesh Province from Janamat Party. Sah, a resident of Sabaila, Nepal was elected to the 2017 provincial assembly election from Dhanusha 1(A).

Electoral history

2017 Nepalese provincial elections

References

External links

Living people
Members of the Provincial Assembly of Madhesh Province
Madhesi people
People from Dhanusha District
Communist Party of Nepal (Unified Marxist–Leninist) politicians
1970 births